Harold Hamilton may refer to:

Harold Hamilton (1885–1937), member of the Australasian Antarctic expedition of 1911–1914
Harold P. Hamilton (1924–2003), American soldier, college president, professor, state government official and charity administrator.